17 March 599 coincided with Thirteenth of Rajab, 24 BH: Birth of Ali ibn Abi Talib in the Ka'ba, in the city of Mecca.
 610: Ali converted to Islam soon before the first revelation of the Quran.
 613: Yawm al-Inzar: Muhammad invited the Banu Hashim to Islam; Ali alone accepted his call.
 617- 619: Meccan boycott of the Hashemites
 619:Year of Sorrow:Death of Abu Talib, Ali's father.
 September 622: Laylat al-mabit: Ali risked his life by sleeping in Muhammad's bed to impersonate him and thwart an assassination plot, so that Muhammad could escape from Mecca in safety and migrate to Medina.
 622: Ali migrated with his wife, Fatima Zahra and Umm Kulthum, and another women.
 622 or 623:The prophet chose him as his brother.
 623: Ali married with Fatima Zahra, Muhammad's daughter.
 624
 March 17: Battle of Badr: Ali first distinguished himself as a warrior and killed about 20 to 22 pagans.
 Expulsion of the Bani Qainuqa Jews from Medina.
 625:
 Birth of Hasan ibn Ali, the second Shia Imam.
 Battle of Uhud: Ali destroyed the standard bearers and when the army of Islam was defeated and most of the Muslims had fled Ali was one of the few Muslims who defended Muhammad.
 Expulsion of Banu Nadir Jews from Medina.
 626:
 Birth of Husayn ibn Ali, the third Shia Imam.
 Expedition of Banu Mustaliq.
 627
 Battle of the Trench: Ali ibn Abi Talib triumphed in combat over Arabs' hero, Amr ibn Wodd, and killed him.
 Killing and enslavement of Banu Quraiza.
 628
 Treaty of Hudaybiyyah
 Battle of Khaybar:  Ali was the standard-bearer and conqueror of the Khaybar's castle.
 Birth of Zaynab bint Ali
 629
 Participating in The first pilgrimage with the Prophet.
 Death of Ali's brother Ja'far ibn Abi Talib in the Battle of Mu'tah
 630
 Conquest of Mecca:Ali was the standard-bearer.
 Battle of Hunayn
 Battle of Autas
 Siege of Ta'if
 Operation against Banu Tayy
 631
 Mubahela with the Christian of Najran
 Expedition against Banu Rumla
 Operation against Banu Zubuda
 Mission to Yemen
 632
 Participation in Farewell pilgrimage at Mecca.
 Event of Ghadir Khumm
 Death of Muhammad
 Abu Bakr assumes power as the first Rashidun caliph
 Death of Fatimah, Ali's wife.
 644: Umar, the second Rashidun caliph, was assassinated. Ali was one of the electoral council to choose the third caliph
 648: Birth of Al-Abbas ibn Ali
 656:
 Siege and assassination of Uthman, the third Rashidun caliph.
 Election of Ali as the fourth Rashidun caliph.
 Beginning of the First Fitna(first Islamic civil war).
 Battle of Bassorah
 657:Ali shifted the capital of Rashidun empire from Medina to Kufa in Iraq.
 May–July 657: Battle of Siffin
 658:
 The Arbitration
 Revolt of Kharijits.
 July 658: Battle of Nahrawan
 659:
 Ali's governor of Egypt was defeated and Egypt was conquered by 'Amr ibn al-'As
 Revolt of Khurrit ibn Rashid
 Muawiyah I plundered Iraq
 660:
 Muawiyah plundered Hijaz and Yemen, but later withdrew
 28 January 661 coincided with Twenty-first of Ramadan: Ali dead in Kufa and buried in Najaf two days after he was struck by Abd-al-Rahman ibn Muljam in the Great Mosque of Kufa.
 Al-Hasan, election as Caliph after Ali's death in 661.
 Muawiyah I declared himself as caliph in Damascus

See also
 History of Islam
 Timeline of Islamic history
 Muhammad before Medina
 Muhammad in Medina
 Muhammad after the conquest of Mecca
 Imamate and Wilayah of Ali ibn Abi Talib

Notes

References
 

Ali
Ali